Daniel Manning Pope (born March 19, 1963) is an American businessman and politician. He is the 35th Mayor of Lubbock, Texas, and has completed his third term as Mayor.

Early life 
Pope was born in Temple, Texas to Bert and Marcia Pope and graduated from Temple High School. He is an Eagle Scout in the Boy Scouts of America. Pope attended Texas Tech University where he was a member of Phi Delta Theta fraternity. He graduated with a Bachelor of Business Administration degree in Finance from the Rawls College of Business in 1985.

Political career 
On November 12, 2015, Pope announced his candidacy for the 2016 City of Lubbock mayoral election. On May 7, 2016, Pope won the general election to replace outgoing mayor Glen Robertson, a current Republican candidate for Texas's 19th congressional district seat. Pope won 53 percent of the vote in the four-person non-partisan race. He avoided a runoff election with the second-place candidate, who finished with 32 percent of the ballots cast.

On May 5, 2018, Pope won a second two-year term as mayor with 78 percent of the vote over two little-known challengers. In the campaign, Pope stressed public safety, including a new police facility, and planning for Lubbock's future growth.  The 2020 Mayoral election, in which Pope is standing, was scheduled to take place on May 2, however was postponed to November 3 after a proclamation from Texas Governor Greg Abbott to allow political subdivisions to delay voting. Lubbock native Stephen Sanders is challenging Pope. Sanders had run against Pope before as a write in candidate during the 2018 mayoral election.

Pope and his wife, Denise, have two children, Manning and Anne Claire. Pope is a former member of the Lubbock Independent School District Board of Trustees, and Rawls College of Business Advisory Council.

Controversies as Mayor 
In September 2020 Pope issued a public apology for not recusing himself from a vote that helped direct taxpayer money toward a business investment made by his wife.

Electoral history

References

1963 births
Living people
Mayors of Lubbock, Texas
School board members in Texas
People from Temple, Texas
Temple High School (Texas) alumni
Rawls College of Business alumni
Businesspeople from Texas
21st-century American politicians
Texas Republicans